William Henry Tompkins Harvey (12 April 1896 – 1972) was an English association football player and manager. He played as an outside right in the Football League for Sheffield Wednesday and Birmingham. He also played first-class cricket for Border and Warwickshire.

Early life
Harvey was born at the Royal Victoria Hospital in Netley, near Southampton, in 1896.

Playing career
Harvey played for Sheffield Wednesday, Birmingham and Southend United. His most successful spell was at Birmingham, where he made over 70 Football League appearances.

Managerial career
Harvey managed Birmingham from 1927 to 1928, Chesterfield from 1932 to 1938 and Gillingham from 1938 to 1939.

He died in North Shields, which was then in Northumberland, in 1972.

References

1896 births
1972 deaths
People from Netley
Footballers from Southampton
English footballers
England amateur international footballers
Association football outside forwards
Birmingham City F.C. players
Sheffield Wednesday F.C. players
Southend United F.C. players
English Football League players
English football managers
Gillingham F.C. managers
Chesterfield F.C. managers
Birmingham City F.C. managers
English cricketers
Border cricketers
Warwickshire cricketers
Cricketers from Southampton